MVM (stylised in lower case as mvm) is a Portuguese digital cable and satellite television thematic television channel. MVM stands for Moda, Vida e Música (Fashion, Life and Music). It was launched as a website in April 2007. It was then later expanded into a television channel on 23 February 2008, and MVM went closed on 3 November 2020.

MVM is channel largely devoted to live stand-up comedy shows across various cities, music videos, fashion, nightlife, as well as extreme sports. The channel was founded and is operated by TVTEL, a former cable and satellite operator which also owns a regional channel, RTV.

External links
mvm official website

Mass media in Portugal
Television networks in Portugal
Defunct television channels in Portugal
Television stations in Portugal
Portuguese-language television stations
Television channels and stations established in 2008
Television channels and stations disestablished in 2020